The Matchmaker (lit. "Once I Was") is a 2010 Israeli film written, directed and produced by Avi Nesher, based on the novel When Heroes Fly by award-winning author Amir Gutfreund.  It premiered as an official selection at the 2010 Toronto International Film Festival and later that year won the Silver Plaque award at the Chicago International Film Festival.  It received seven nominations for Israel's Ophir Awards in 2010, including Best Picture, where Adir Miller also won in the Best Actor category and Maya Dagan won in the Best Actress category.

Cast
 Tuval Shafir as Arik Burstein
 Adir Miller as Yankel Braiyd
 Maya Dagan as Clara Epstein
 Dror Keren as Meir the Librarian
 Dov Navon as Yozi Burstein
 Yarden Bar-Kochva as Nili Burstein
 Neta Porat as Tamara
 Bat-El Papura as Sylvia
 Kobi Faraj as Moshe Abadi
 Yael Leventhal as Tikva Abadi
 Tom Gal as Benny Abadi
 Eyal Shechter as Arik Burstein (adult)
 Yaakov Bodo as Adv. Segalson
 Eli Yatzpan as Uncle Nadgi

Soundtrack
 Yehezkel – The High Windows
 Yona Paamona
 White Rabbit – Jefferson Airplane
 Sunshine of your Love – Cream

References

External links
 
 

2010 films
2010s Hebrew-language films
Israeli drama films
Films directed by Avi Nesher
Films scored by Philippe Sarde
Films based on Israeli novels
Films set in 1968
Films set in 2006
Films set in Haifa
Films about people with dwarfism